Uprising is a synonym for rebellion.

Uprising may also refer to:

Art, entertainment, and media

Books and comics
 StarCraft: Uprising, an ebook novel in the StarCraft series by Micky Neilson
 Uprising!, a 1981 history book by David Irving
 Uprising, a 2001 novel by Randy Boyd
Uprising (novel), a 2007 novel by Margaret Peterson Haddix
Uprising, a 2008 comic by Brian Bendis
Uprising, a 2009 novel by Douglas Bland
Uprising, a 2010 novel by Scott Mariani
Uprising, a 2010 Star Wars novel by Alex Wheeler
Uprising, a 2014 sci-fi novel by Jeremy Robinson 
Uprising, a 2014  novel by Jack Whyte 
Uprising, a 2019 science fiction novel by Fletcher DeLancey, the eighth book in the Chronicles of Alsea series 
 Uprising: How to Build a Brand--and Change the World--By Sparking Cultural Movements, a non-fiction book by Scott Goodson
 Uprising (Diamond and Silk book), 2020 book by Diamond and Silk

Film and television 
 The Uprising (film), a 1912 silent short film drama
 Uprising (2001 film), a 2001 film about the Warsaw Ghetto Uprising
 Uprising (2012 film), a 2012 film based on the 2011 Egyptian Revolution
 Pacific Rim: Uprising, a 2018 sequel to Pacific Rim
 "Uprising" (Agents of S.H.I.E.L.D.), an episode of the American television series Agents of S.H.I.E.L.D.
 "Uprising" (Arrow), an episode of the American television series Arrow
 Uprising (TV series), a 2021 three-part documentary series

Video games
 Uprising (video game) or Uprising: Join or Die, a 1997 military combat game, followed by two sequels
 Command & Conquer: Red Alert 3 – Uprising, a 2009 real-time strategy game
 Kid Icarus: Uprising, a 2012 third-person shooter
 Boston Uprising, a professional Overwatch League team

Music
 Uprising Records, record label
 "Uprising" (song), the first single from the Muse album The Resistance
Uprising, a song by Sabaton

Albums

 Uprising (Bleed from Within album), a 2013 heavy metal album
 Uprising (Bob Marley and the Wailers album), a 1980 reggae album
 Uprising (Concord Dawn album), a 2003 drum and bass album
 Uprising (Entombed album), a 2000 heavy metal album
 Uprising (Universal Poplab album), a 2006 synthpop album
 The Uprising (album), an album by Foreign Beggars

See also
 List of revolutions and rebellions
 Serbian Uprising (disambiguation)